During its closing ceremony, the Marrakech International Film Festival (FIFM) issues awards among the following to the best films, filmmakers and actors in the competition. These awards may or may not be issued every year.

Golden Star (Étoile d’or)/Grand prix

The Jury Prize

Best Actress

Best Actor

Jury Prize for Best Director

Prize for the best interpretation

The Best Director Award

Best Screenplay Award

Golden Star Grand Prize Short Film

Special Jury Prize Short Film

The Cinécoles Short Film Prize

The Cinécoles Short Film Prize was created in 2010 and focuses on new cinematographic talent and is open to students from Morocco's cinema schools and institutes.

Through the competition, the FIFM Foundation offers opportunity for film creation and career advancement for new filmmakers and during the festival creates a platform for discussion between seasoned professionals and less-experienced filmmakers.

The competition provides an occasion to present the student cinema for the first time in Morocco and within the framework of a prestigious event.

The Cinécoles Prize comes with a grant worth 300,000 dirhams, donated by His Royal Highness Prince Moulay Rachid, President of the FIFM Foundation, for the film student to make his or her second short film. It is managed by the FIFM Foundation and must be used to make a new film, which must be completed during the three years following the award. In this way, the FIFM Foundation supports the creation of this second work through careful monitoring and participation in the different stages of writing, directing and editing.

The Short Film Jury for the 13th edition of the Marrakech International Film Festival (2013) was presided over by Moroccan filmmaker Nour Eddine Lakhmari and included Astrid Bergès-Frisbey - Actress (France), Jan Kounen - Director & screenwriter (France), Atiq Rahimi - Novelist, director & screenwriter (Afghanistan) and Sylvie Testud - Actress, director, screenwriter & author (France).

References

Moroccan awards
African film awards
Cinema of Morocco